Roman Raymond Frederick (July 31, 1929 – August 23, 2001) was a Canadian professional ice hockey goaltender who played five games in the National Hockey League with the Chicago Black Hawks during the 1954–55 NHL season. He retired in 1959.

References

External links

1929 births
2001 deaths
Canadian ice hockey goaltenders
Chicago Blackhawks players
Ice hockey people from Ontario
Sportspeople from Fort Frances